Van Buren State Park can refer to:

Van Buren State Park (Michigan)
Van Buren State Park (Ohio)